Eric Lamb may refer to:

 Eric III of Denmark (c. 1120–1146), or Eric III Lamb, King of Denmark from 1137 until 1146
 Eric Lamb (musician) (born 1978), American flutist